Ellenstein is a surname. People with that name include:

 Meyer C. Ellenstein (1886–1967), Mayor of Newark, New Jersey from 1933 to 1941
 Rachel Ellenstein, a fictional character from the universe of Highlander movies
 Robert Ellenstein (1923–2010), American actor
 Sylvain Ellenstein, a fictional character

See also
 Ellen Stein (disambiguation)
 Elleinstein, a surname